Narinder Kaur Bharaj is an Indian politician and lawyer, and the member of legislative assembly from Sangrur Assembly constituency. She defeated the incumbent cabinet minister Vijay Inder Singla of Indian National Congress in 2022 elections. Also, she became the youngest MLA in Punjab. She is also District youth president of Aam Aadmi Party.

Early life
Bharaj was born on 17 August 1994 to father Gurnam Singh. Her father Gurnam Singh is a farmer. She pursued post graduation in Sociology from Punjabi University. She completed law in a private college in Sangrur.

On 8 October 2022, she married Mandeep Singh, an AAP member.

Political career
Bharaj started her political career in 2014 in a campaign for Bhagwant Mann in Sangrur. She was the only polling booth agent for Mann in her village. In 2018, she became district youth president and spokesperson of Aam Aadmi Party in Sangrur.

2022 elections
On 26 December 2021, she was announced candidate of Aam Aadmi Party from Sangrur constituency for 2022 assembly elections. She was among the front runners for the ticket among Minku Jawandha and Dinesh Bansal. After her name was announced Bansal and some other party workers protested at Bhagwant Mann's residence against her candidature. She filed her nomination on 28 January 2022. She declared her assets worth ₹24,409, one of the lowest in the state. She faced cabinet minister Vijay Inder Singla, and former MLA Arvind Khanna as opponents. On 10 March 2022, she secured 74,851 votes (51.67%), and defeated Singla with margin of 36,430 votes, highest-ever in Sangrur. The Aam Aadmi Party gained a strong 79% majority in the sixteenth Punjab Legislative Assembly by winning 92 out of 117 seats in the 2022 Punjab Legislative Assembly election. MP Bhagwant Mann was sworn in as Chief Minister on 16 March 2022.

Member of Legislative Assembly
She represents the Sangrur Assembly constituency as MLA in Punjab Assembly.

Committee assignments of Punjab Legislative Assembly 
Member (2022–23) Committee on Privileges
Member (2022–23) Committee on Petitions

Electoral performance

References

Living people
Punjab, India MLAs 2022–2027
Aam Aadmi Party politicians from Punjab, India
1994 births